Lepta is the second full-length album by the Russian folk metal band Arkona. It was released on 30 December 2004 through Sound Age Production.

Track listing
 "Sotkany Veka" (Woven Ages) – 4:14
 "Lepta o Gneve" (Contribution to Wrath) – 5:26	
 "Chyornye Debri Voyny" (Black Thickets of War) – 4:29	
 "Zarnitsy Nashey Svobody" (Dawns of Our Freedom) – 5:40	
 "Vyidu Ya na Volyushku" (I'll Come to the Free Lands) – 3:37	
 "Voin Pravdy" (Warrior of Truth) – 05:46	
 "Marena" – 7:24	
 "Epilog" – 1:51	
 "Oy, To Ne Vecher..." (Oh, That Is Not Eve) – 3:12

Track # 3 is dedicated to the memory of those fallen in the terrorist attacks in Russia. Track # 9 is a Russian folk song.

Original track listing (in Russian)
 "Сотканы века"
 "Лепта о гневе"
 "Черные дебри войны"
 "Зарницы нашей свободы"
 "Выйду я на волюшку"
 "Воин правды"
 "Марена"
 "Эпилог"
 "Ой, то не вечер..."

Credits
 Masha "Scream" – vocals, keyboards, flute
 Alexei "Lesyar" Agafonov – vocals (track #3)
 Sergei "Lazar" – guitars
 Ruslan "Kniaz" – bass
 Vlad "Artist" – drums

2004 albums
Arkona (band) albums